These are the rosters of all participating teams at the Men's water polo tournament at the 2007 World Aquatics Championships held between 18 March to 1 April in Melbourne, Australia.































See also
Water polo at the 2007 World Aquatics Championships – Women's team rosters

References

World Aquatics Championships water polo squads
Men's team rosters